The Torodorinae are a subfamily of small moths in the family Lecithoceridae.

Taxonomy and systematics
Anaxyrina Meyrick, 1918
Antiochtha Meyrick, 1905
Athymoris Meyrick, 1935
Caveana Park, 2010
Chrysonasma Park in Park & Byun, 2008
Coproptilia Snellen, 1903
Cubitomoris Gozmány in Amsel et al., 1978
Deltoplastis Meyrick, 1925
Dixognatha Wu, 2002
Eccedoxa Gozmány, 1973
Epharmonia Meyrick, 1925
Halolaguna Gozmány in Amsel et al., 1978
Heppneralis Park, 2013
Hygroplasta Meyrick, 1925
Hyperochtha Meyrick, 1925
Lepidozonates Park in Park, Heppner & Lee, 2013
Nephelographa Gozmány in Amsel et al., 1978
Notialis Park in Park & Kim, 2009
Philharmonia Gozmány in Amsel et al., 1978
Thubana Walker, 1864
Thymbritis Meyrick, 1925
Torodora Meyrick, 1894
Triviola Park, 2010

References

 
Lecithoceridae
Moth subfamilies